The Sauerland Net is a group of railway services in the western Sauerland and the eastern Ruhr of the German state of North Rhine-Westphalia and consists of three Regionalbahn services, RB 52 (Dortmund–Hagen–Lüdenscheid), RB 53 (Dortmund–Schwerte–Iserlohn) and RB 54 (Unna–Fröndenberg–Menden–Neuenrade), and the Regional-Express service RE 57 (Dortmund–Bestwig–Winterberg/Brilon Stadt). The RB 52 also carries the brand name of the Volmetal-Bahn, the RB 53 is called the Ardey-Bahn, the RB 54 is called the Hönnetal-Bahn and the RE 57 is called the Dortmund Sauerland-Express. In December 2004, DB Regio NRW took over or retained operations of these services. Previously the RB 53, RB 54 and RE 57 had been operated by DB Regio NRW and RB 52 had been operated by the Dortmund-Märkische Eisenbahn (DME).

The RE 17 (Sauerland-Express) service will be included in the Sauerland Net under the next contract for the operation of services beginning in 2016.

Tender 

The Zweckverband Nahverkehr Westfalen-Lippe (local transport association of Westphalia-Lippe, NWL) published a call for tenders for the operation of passenger services on the Sauerland Network from December 2016 in the Official Journal of the European Union on 9 October 2012. As a result, Regional-Express services RE 17 and 57 and Regionalbahn services RB 52, 53 and 54 might have had a new operator. Some improvements are to be made on trains for the carriage of the disabled and there will be more space for bicycles, more guards, ticket machines on the trains rather than on the platforms, as well as improved connections in Menden (to Dortmund) and Schwerte (to Münster). It will involve about 5.6 million train-kilometres a year, at a cost of €9–10 per train-km, a total cost of about €50 to 55 million. Because the operation of the network is to be contracted for a period of 12 years, it will be worth more than €600 million.

Competition is needed in order to maintain fares. The NWL has offered financing for the rollingstock through the municipal budget and to reimburse the top three losing tenderers tender costs of up to €100,000. Passengers will benefit from the competition in the Sauerland as the trains will be accessible to the disabled with entrance heights of 1.2 metres as is already the case with the Sauerland-Express. Due to the great success of the Ruhr Valley Cycle Route, RE 17 will have additional space for bicycles (which already exists on RE 57 services). In addition, the NWL has specified that future trains on the Upper Ruhr Valley Railway (RE 17/57) will have a top speed of 140 km/h. Thus, the journey time to Schwerte will be cut, which will allow a connection to Münster. The timetable will be changed to ensure a quick connection at Fröndenberg from Neuenrade and at Menden to Dortmund. The current service is to be maintained. The same applies to the sale of tickets at DB ticket offices and DB agencies. However, ticket machines should be available in trains from the end of 2016 and no longer on the platforms, as this will prevent damage from vandalism. After 7 PM all trains will be staffed with on-board staff, this will increase total staff on the trains. 
 
The contract was awarded to DB Regio, which will use LINK (II or III) DMUs made by the Polish manufacturer PESA.

Operations 

The DB Regio NRW procured 21 new LINT 41 railcars for operation on the Sauerland network, which were manufactured by Alstom. These replaced older vehicles such as the class VT 628 or Bombardier Talent railcars. Vehicles from the class 612 were also used. Since 2018, the most of the Sauerland network has been equipped with the Pesa Link (class 632 and 633) multiple units planned at the letting of the new tender in 2013, and since the 2021/2022 timetable change, only the Pesa Link multiple units have run. The old Talent railcars are only kept as reserve vehicles.

RB 52 – Volmetal-Bahn 

The Volmetal-Bahn (RB 52) service connects Dortmund, Hagen and Lüdenscheid.

On its way from Dortmund Hauptbahnhof to Lüdenscheid station, the service first runs over a section of the Dortmund–Soest railway and then over a section of the Düsseldorf-Derendorf–Dortmund Süd railway.  It runs over the Hagen–Dieringhausen railway (also known as the Volmetalbahn, meaning Volme Valley Railway) from Hagen Hauptbahnhof to Lüdenscheid-Brügge station. Finally, it runs over the Brügge–Lüdenscheid railway from Brügge station to the higher Lüdenscheid station.

Services 

The service runs every hour, seven days a week, except that services run every two hours on Sunday mornings.

Planning 

The Volmetal-Bahn will in future run an hour earlier from Lüdenscheid to Hagen on Saturdays and Sundays. In addition, the Märkischer Kreis is campaigning for a 30-minute cycle of the Volmetal-Bahn from Lüdenscheid via Hagen to Dortmund, since Lüdenscheid station would support higher demand.

RB 53 – Ardey-Bahn 

The Ardey-Bahn (RB 53) service connects Dortmund, Schwerte and Iserlohn. It follows the Ardey Railway (Ardeybahn in German).

Services 
The service runs every half hour during the week and every hour on the weekend.

RB 54 – Hönnetal-Bahn 

The Hönnetal-Bahn (RB 54) service connects Unna, Fröndenberg and Neuenrade. The service follows the Fröndenberg–Kamen railway, the Letmathe–Fröndenberg railway and the Hönne Valley Railway (Hönnetalnbahn in German).

Services 

The service runs hourly during the week. On Sundays services run every two hours between Menden and Neuenrade.

RE 57 – Dortmund-Sauerland-Express 

The Dortmund-Sauerland-Express (RE 57) connects Dortmund and Fröndenberg with Winterberg and Brilon Stadt. It runs along the Ardey Railway, the Upper Ruhr Valley Railway and then on either the Nuttlar–Frankenberg railway or the Alme Valley Railway.

Services 

The service runs hourly during the week. It runs alternately to Winterberg or Brilon Stadt.

Fares 

The following fares apply to the Sauerland Net: the Verkehrsverbund Rhein-Ruhr (Rhine-Ruhr transport association) fares in the Dortmund and Hagen areas, the Verkehrsgemeinschaft Ruhr-Lippe (Ruhr-Lippe transport community) fares in the Sauerland/Ruhr-Lippe fare zone and the NRW statewide fares.

See also 

List of regional railway lines in North Rhine-Westphalia

Notes

External links 

 

Rail services in North Rhine-Westphalia
Named DB Regio services